"Jump in the River" is a song recorded by Irish singer Sinéad O'Connor. It originally appeared on the Married to the Mob soundtrack in 1988 and was released as a single the same year. It was also released as a 12" maxi-single that included a remixed version featuring the American performance artist Karen Finley. The song was later included on O'Connor's second studio album I Do Not Want What I Haven't Got (1990), as well as on the B-side of the 7" single for "Nothing Compares 2 U."

Composition
A year after O'Connor released her first album, The Lion and the Cobra, she contributed "Jump in the River" to the soundtrack of Jonathan Demme's film Married to the Mob in 1988. Later that year, O'Connor took part in a concert organized by the human rights activist group Refuse & Resist! at the Palladium in New York City. It was there that she met the performance artist Karen Finley, who she invited to participate in the 12" remix of "Jump in the River." Finley contributed a sexually explicit spoken-word section of the song. Village Voice rock critic Robert Christgau wrote that Finley "surfaced as the voice of mad lust on a dance remix of the ravishingly sexual 'Jump in the River.'"

Charts

Track listings
7" single
 Jump in the River
 Never Get Old

12" maxi-single
 Jump in the River
 Jerusalem
 Jump in the River (remix featuring Karen Finley)

Credits and personnel
Sinéad O'Connor – music and lyrics, lead vocals, producer, mixing
Marco Pirroni – music and lyrics
Chris Birkett – engineering, mixing
Fachtna O' Ceallaigh – mixing

References

1988 songs
1988 singles
Sinéad O'Connor songs
Songs written by Sinéad O'Connor